Czarni Pruszcz Gdański is a Polish football team from Pruszcz Gdański, Poland.

History

The club were founded in 1961. Throughout the club's history they have played in the lower regional divisions in Poland. The club have only had success in the Pomeranian leagues, with their only competition win coming in 2006 by winning the Pomeranian Voivodeship Polish Cup. For three seasons from 2005 until 2008, Czarni played in the IV liga for the only time in their history, with their highest finish being 8th in the 2005–06 season. For the 2006–07 season Czarni were included in the Polish Cup through which they qualified for after winning the Pomeranian Voivodeship Polish Cup. They beat Kłos Pełczyce 6–1 in the playoff stage, losing to Jagiellonia Białystok in the first round.

Women's team
The ladies side was created in 2015 and played 3 seasons before disbanding in 2019.

Honours

IV liga: 8th place (highest finish)
Pomeranian Voivodeship Polish Cup: 2005–06
Polish Cup: (1st round) 2006–07

References

External links
90minut.pl profile

Association football clubs established in 1961
1961 establishments in Poland
Football clubs in Pomeranian Voivodeship